Demolition 23 is the self-titled debut album from the American/Finnish rock band Demolition 23.  The album was released in 1994 in Europe and the UK on the Music for Nations label, and in Japan on the Renegade Nation Label.  Music videos were made for the songs "Nothin's Alright" and "Hammersmith Palais".

Track listing

Personnel 
Musicians

 Michael Monroe - lead vocals, harmonica
 Jay Hening - guitar, backing vocals
 Sami Yaffa - bass, backing vocals
 Jimmy Clark - drums, backing vocals

Additional Musicians

 Steven Van Zandt - backing vocals
 Kory Clarke - backing vocals
 Jude Wilder - backing vocals

Production

 Steven Van Zandt - producer
 George Marino - mastering
 Ben Fowler - recording, mixing

Charts

References 

Punk rock albums by Finnish artists
Punk rock albums by American artists
Glam punk albums
1994 debut albums